The 2018 Boston Pizza Cup was held 31 January to 4 February at the Grant Fuhr Arena in Spruce Grove, Alberta. The winning Brendan Bottcher rink represented Alberta at the 2018 Tim Hortons Brier in Regina, Saskatchewan.

The semifinal and final games were broadcast on Sportsnet One.

Qualification Method
Twelve teams qualified for the provincial tournament through several methods. The qualification process is as follows:

  Because he had competed as Team Canada in the 2017 Tim Hortons Brier, Kevin Koe would also have been eligible for direct entry to the 2018 Boston Pizza Cup as a past provincial/national champion. Had Koe entered, only one team would have qualified via ACF bonspiel points. However, Koe's team withdrew from the 2018 Boston Pizza Cup after qualifying to represent Canada in the 2018 Winter Olympics.

Teams
The teams are as follows:

Knockout Draw Brackets
The draw is listed as follows:

A Event
{{16TeamBracket-Compact-NoSeeds-Byes
| RD1= First Knockout
| RD2= 
| RD3= 
| RD4= Qualifier 1
| team-width= 150px
| RD1-team03= Garnett
| RD1-score03=4 
| RD1-team04= Vavrek
| RD1-score04=8
| RD1-team05= Usselman
| RD1-score05=2
| RD1-team06= Sturmay
| RD1-score06=4
| RD1-team11= Harty
| RD1-score11=11
| RD1-team12= Hutchings
| RD1-score12=10
| RD1-team13=Park
| RD1-score13=8
| RD1-team14=Webb
| RD1-score14=5

| RD2-team01= Bottcher
| RD2-score01=9
| RD2-team02= Vavrek
| RD2-score02=3
| RD2-team03= Slushinski 
| RD2-score03=4
| RD2-team04= Sturmay
| RD2-score04=7
| RD2-team05=Appelman
| RD2-score05= 7
| RD2-team06= Harty
| RD2-score06=6
| RD2-team07= Thomas| RD2-score07=7| RD2-team08= Park
|RD2-score08=6

| RD3-team01= Bottcher| RD3-score01= 10| RD3-team02= Sturmay
| RD3-score02=7
| RD3-team03= Appelman
| RD3-score03=5
| RD3-team04= Thomas| RD3-score04=7| RD4-team01= Bottcher| RD4-score01=7'| RD4-team02= Thomas 
| RD4-score02=6
}}

B Event 

C Event 

Playoffs

A vs. BFebruary 3, 6:30pmC1 vs. C2February 3, 6:30pmSemifinalFebruary 4, 11:00amFinalFebruary 4, 5:00pm''

References

External links

Curling in Alberta
2018 Tim Hortons Brier
Spruce Grove
2018 in Alberta
January 2018 sports events in Canada
February 2018 sports events in Canada